Peter McLean was an Australian professional rugby league footballer who played in the 1940s and 1950s.  He played for Western Suburbs as a lock.

Playing career
McLean made his debut for Western Suburbs in 1947 and in his second season playing for the club was a member of the Wests side which claimed their third premiership defeating Balmain 8-5 at the Sydney Sports Ground.  

In 1950, McLean played in his second grand final which was the 21-15 defeat by South Sydney.  In 1952, McLean was a member of the Wests side which defeated Souths in the 1952 grand final with McLean scoring a try.  This would be Western Suburbs fourth and last premiership as a stand alone club before exiting the competition in 1999.  McLean played one more season in 1953 as captain-coach before retiring.

References

Australian rugby league coaches
Australian rugby league players
Rugby league locks
Rugby league players from Sydney
Western Suburbs Magpies captains
Western Suburbs Magpies coaches
Western Suburbs Magpies players